S5 or S-5 may refer to:

Science
 Pentasulfur (S5), an allotrope of sulfur
 S5, the symmetric group on five elements
 S5: Keep contents under ... (appropriate liquid to be specified by the manufacturer), a safety phrase in chemistry
 Sacral spinal nerve 5, a spinal nerve of the sacral segment
 S5, the fifth sacral vertebra of the vertebral column, in human anatomy

Technology

Electronics
 Canon PowerShot S5 IS, a 2007 8.0 megapixel bridge digital camera
 Coolpix S5, a 6 Megapixels Nikon Coolpix series digital camera
 FinePix S5 Pro, a 2006 digital single lens reflex camera by Fujifilm
 Samsung Galaxy S5, an Android smartphone by Samsung
 Samsung Galaxy Tab S5e, an Android tablet
 Simatic S5 PLC, a programmable logic controller family by Siemens

Software
 S5 (file format), for defining slideshows
 ACPI S5 power state, of the Advanced Configuration and Power Interface in computing

Transportation

Airlines and airports
 Shuttle America (IATA airline code: S5)
 Trast Aero, (IATA airline code: S5)
 Bandon State Airport (FAA code: S05)
 Slovenia, International Aircraft Registration Prefixes (ICAO country code: S5)

Mass-transit lines
S-Bahn
 S5 (Berlin)
 S5 (Munich)
 S5 (Nuremberg)
 S5 (RER Vaud), an S-Bahn line in Switzerland
 S5 (Rhine-Main S-Bahn)
 S5 (Rhine-Ruhr S-Bahn)
 S5 (St. Gallen S-Bahn), an S-Bahn line in Switzerland
 S5 (ZVV), in the cantons of Zürich, St. Gallen and Schwyz in Switzerland
 S5, a Hanover S-Bahn line
 S5, a Stuttgart S-Bahn line

Other lines
 S5, a Stadtbahn Karlsruhe line, Germany
 FGC line S5, a suburban train line in Barcelona Province, Spain

Roads
 County Route S5 (California), a county route in California, U.S.
 S5 Shanghai–Jiading Expressway in Shanghai, China

Vehicles
Aircraft
 Rans S-5 Coyote, an ultralight aircraft
 Sikorsky S-5, Igor Sikorsky's first successful aircraft design
 Supermarine S.5, a 1920s British single-engined single-seat racing seaplane
Automobiles
 Audi S5, a German compact executive sports car
 BYD Song, a Chinese compact SUV known as the BYD S5 in Egypt
 Haima S5, a Chinese compact SUV
 Haima S5 Young, a Chinese subcompact SUV
 Huansu S5, a Chinese compact SUV
 JAC Refine S5, a Chinese compact SUV
 Luxgen S5, a Taiwanese compact sedan
Spacecraft
 Saturn V, the rocket used mostly in the Apollo program
Trains
 ALCO S-5, and American diesel switching (shunting) locomotive
 Prussian S 5, an 1894 steam locomotives class; see List of Prussian locomotives and railbuses
 Supermarine S.5, a 1920s British single-engined single-seat racing seaplane
Watercraft
 USS S-5 (SS-110), a 1919 S-class submarine of the United States Navy

Other uses
 S5 (modal logic), in logic and philosophy
 S-5 rocket
 S5 (band), an Indian pop band
 S5 (classification), a disability swimming classification
 British NVC community S5, a swamps and tall-herb fens community in the British National Vegetation Classification system
 Fifth year, in the Scottish education system
 S5, a public affairs officer within military units; see staff
 S5 postcode, in the S postcode area covering areas of northern Sheffield
 S-5 visa, a non-immigrant visa which allows travel to United States for individuals who are witnesses, informants

See also
 SysV, the UNIX System V